Mark Jeffrey Flannery is an American economist, currently the Bank of America Eminent Scholar Chair at Warrington School of Business, University of Florida and, from 2000 to 2005, was the Editor of the Journal of Money, Credit and Banking.

References

Bibliography

Year of birth missing (living people)
Living people
University of Florida faculty
American economists
Corporate finance theorists